Baityaan, written by Atif Ali and directed by Ali Ahmed, is a Pakistani drama serial shown on Hum TV in 2009.

Cast
 Abid Ali 
 Azfar Rehman
 Farhan Ali Agha
 Hasan Niazi
 Syed Jibran
 Qavi Khan
 Saveera Nadeem
 Tooba Siddiqui 
 Zeba Shehnaz

References

2009 Pakistani television series debuts
2009 Pakistani television series endings
Pakistani drama television series
Urdu-language television shows
Hum TV original programming
Television shows set in Karachi